Corridors of Power is an Australian comedy television series that first screened on the ABC in 2001.

The series features the private and public lives of two ambitious federal parliamentary backbenchers Fielding (Philip Quast) and Dunne (Jeremy Sims) who are contesting the same seat in a federal election.

Cast
 Philip Quast as Michael Fielding MP
 Jeremy Sims as Tony Dunne MP
 Anne Looby as Caroline Fielding
 Belinda McClory as Tanya Dunne
 Ed Wightman as Craig
 Kristy Wright as Vanessa 'Van' Harrison
 Simon Chilvers as Lester

Serving politicians Bruce Baird, Bob Brown, Cheryl Kernot, Mark Latham, Christopher Pyne and Natasha Stott Despoja made cameos as themselves.

List of episodes

(Episode information retrieved from Australian Television Information Archive).

References

External links
 http://www.australiantelevision.net/corridors.html Australian Television Information Archive
 

2001 Australian television series debuts
2001 Australian television series endings
Australian Broadcasting Corporation original programming
Australian comedy television series
Political satirical television series
Television shows set in Australian Capital Territory